Tygart Creek is a tributary of the Little Kanawha River,  long, in western West Virginia in the United States.

Tygart Creek flows for its entire length in southern Wood County. It rises south of Rockport and flows generally northward through Rockport and Mineral Wells.

According to the West Virginia Department of Environmental Protection, approximately 71% of the Tygart Creek watershed is forested, mostly deciduous.  Approximately 28% is used for pasture and agriculture.

See also
List of rivers of West Virginia

References 

Rivers of West Virginia
Little Kanawha River
Rivers of Wood County, West Virginia